Kunnathur Padi is the historic center for the folk Hindu deity Sree Muthappan. The center stands in Payyavoor Grama Panchayat, Kannur District of the Kerala state of India, 3,000 feet above sea level, on top of Udumbumala in the Sahyadri mountains. The region belonged to the kingdom of the Mannanar dynasty, the line of Muttappan.  In 1902, Kunhikelapan Mannanar, the last king of this dynasty of Muthappan's clan, was killed and the British government seized the property of this dynasty, and Karakattidam Nayanar, a vassal of Mannanar, got the right to manage Kunnathur Padi. 

The Kunnathur Padi festival is conducted here, but no temple exists for Sree Muthappan. The festival takes place in a natural setting, as it is believed that Sree Muthappan said, "Fallen leaves, a spring, a large mountain, a round stone, forest and palm trees are enough for me."

history
This forested hilly area is now known as Kunnathur Padi. There is a shrine of Patikutiyamma here on the top of the hill.  Historians say that the argument is wrong if we examine the brahmanical history. This Arudam is the temple of the Mannanar royal family. Before that, the ancient king Kuttan dynasty ruled from Purali hill.  During the thirty-day long festival, the Mannanars are required to fast by drinking thinakkanji. Only Mannanar and Patni McCachiar have seats here.  All the rest of the countrymen and nobles who come to the festival should spread wild leaves on the ground.  Shanthikars here belonged to two Thiyya communities with the title of Mandakurup and Rairukurup.  Mannanara's palace is also believed to be the birthplace of the grandfather.

Festival Details
During the festival season, a temporary Madappura is erected, called Sreekovil, in the middle of the forest. There is a glade and a cave in the middle of the forest. On the west side of the Madappura is a stone, a rock stand and a mud platform. On each side of the cave there is a palm tree. On the north side, there is a spring called Thiruvankadavu. Beyond that is Aadipadi.

Thanthries do the purifying rituals (Sudhi, Pasudanam, Punyaham, Ganapati homam and Bhagavathiseva). The Malayirakkal (invoking) of Sri Muthappan is done by Puralimala. In all other madappuras, this is done by Kunnathurpadi.

Thiruvappana and Vellattam do not appear simultaneously in the padi as in many other Sree Muthappan centres.

The festival at Padi lasts from the month of Dhanu to Makaram (mid-December to mid-January).

Worship Information
Sree Muthappan is a Hindu deity worshiped commonly in Kannur district of Kerala, India. Muthappan and Thiruvappan are considered to be a manifestation of Shiva and Vishnu and hence, Muthappan wholly represents the idea of Brahman, the unity of God, as expressed in the Vedas.

Worship of Muthappan is unique in that it does not follow the Sattvic (Brahminical) form of worship as in other Hindu temples. The main mode of worship is not by idol worship, but using a ritual enactment of Muthappan. Fish is used as an offering to Muthappan and people of all castes, religions and nationalities are permitted to enter the temple and take part in the worship.

Muthappan is also the principal deity in the worship ritual. The ritual performers of Muthappan Theyyam belong to the tribal community of Kerala. It is unique because in Kerala both the upper-caste Brahmins and the lower-caste tribals have a significant contribution to the major forms of worship.

Kunnathur Padi, the Aroodam of Sri Muthappan is located in Payyavoor Village of Taliparamba Taluk in Kannur District. Kunnathurpadi festival which starts in Malayalam month of Dhanu and ends in Makaram is conducted in a natural setting because Sree Muthappan said that "Fallen leaves, a spring, a large mountain, a round stone, forest and palm trees are enough for me." There are no temples for Muthappan in Kunnathur Padi. This area is beautiful with its greenery and is 3,000 feet above sea level atop Udumbamala in the Sahyadri Mountains. The divinity and the purity of this place with its breathtaking beauty has been maintained for centuries. Any visitor coming to this area will feel the blessing hand of Sri Muthappan and will be able to cross the thin line that separates the spiritual existence and the miseries of the material world. There is an open place and a cave in the middle of the forest. During the festival season a temporary Madappura is erected here which is called Sreekovil. On the west side of this Madappura, there is a stone, a rock stand and a mud platform. On each side of the cave there is a palm tree. On the north side, there is a spring called Thiruvankadavu. Beyond that is Aadipadi.

Thanthries do the purifying rituals (Sudhi, Pasudanam, Punyaham, Ganapati Homam and Bhagavathiseva). The Malayirakkal (invoking) of Sri Muthappan is done by Puralimala. In all other Madappuras this is done by Kunnathurpadi.

Invoking Sri Muthappan

At Kunnathurpadi, invoking of Sri Muthappan (malayirakkal) is from Puralimala whereas at Puralimala, it is from Kunnathurpadi. In all other madappuras, this is done from Kunnathurpadi.

On the first day of the festival four theyyams appear at Padi Puthiya Sri Muthappan, Puramkala Sri Muthappan, Naduvazhissan Daivam and Thiruavappana. The concept of Vannan about Sri Muthappan is that of Eiver Muthappan (five Muthappans) – Puramkala Sri Muthappan, Puralimala Sri Muthappan (Thiruvappana), Nambala Sri Muthappan (Nambala is ant hill) Sri Muthappan (Vellattam), Thoovakkally Sri Muthappan and Andu Muthappan. Muthppan does Pallivetta and accepts veethu (madhu). One of the acts depicts the Lord’s writing on the granite stone with His arrow. He is writing moola mantras.

One thing at Padi is that Thiruvappana and Vellattam do not appear simultaneously as in many other Sri Muthappan centres. He comes at night and goes at night. After the divine dance is over, he sits on the platform and asks Nayanar also to sit in front of him. Sri Muthappan recites the pattola. It is the history of the Lord and His relationship with the Vanavar. Bhandaram (coffer) is brought. Devotees do not put anything directly into the coffer. Offerings are given to the Lord in hand, and Bhagvan places it in the coffer. Then begins the most important aspect of the festival, Sri Muthappan starts His arulapadu, the long wait of the devotees is over and He hears their grievances, consoles them and blesses them, then Vellattam appears after that.

See also
Kottiyoor Temple
Muthappan temple
Parassinikkadavu
Rajarajeshwara temple
Temples of Kerala

References

External links

 http://parassinikadavumuthappan.com

Hindu temples in Kannur district
Villages near Iritty